The 29 Second Film Festival is a South Korean Film Festival, which began in 2011, where all the entries have to be 29 seconds long . It is hosted by Korea Economic Daily and supervised by the Secretariat of 29 Second Film Festival.

The 8th Bacchus 29 Second Film Festival was held on August 18, 2021. Due to COVID-19 pandemic it was held online. 1107, 29 second films were competing for prizes in 2021.

Award winners

2013
  29s film Award : Living in South Korea as OOO.
 S-OIL GOOD 29s film Award : "Theme 1: Better world" and "Theme2: Hero".

2021
Source:
  Grand Prize : My Stop for Recovery from Fatigue is My Daughter's Heart by Ji Seung-hwan
  Grand Prize for the youth department : My Stop for Fatigue is No. 1804 by Jo In-hyuk, director of Incheon Yeonsu High School
  Grand Prize for the General Division : My Stop for Fatigue is Ricianthus by Yoon Ji-hyeon

See also
List of film festivals in South Korea
List of festivals in Asia

References

External links

 

Short film festivals
Film festivals in Seoul
Jung District, Seoul
Annual events in South Korea